Scott Rawls Hutchinson (born May 27, 1956) is an American former college and professional football player who was a defensive end in the National Football League (NFL) for five seasons during the 1970s and 1980s.  Hutchinson played college football for the University of Florida, and thereafter, he played professionally for the Buffalo Bills and the Tampa Bay Buccaneers of the NFL.

Early years 

Hutchinson was born in Winter Park, Florida in 1956.  He attended Winter Park High School, where he played high school football for the Winter Park Wildcats.

College career 

Hutchinson accepted an athletic scholarship to attend the University of Florida in Gainesville, Florida, where he was a defensive lineman for coach Doug Dickey's Florida Gators football team from 1974 to 1977.  As a senior team captain in 1977, he was a first-team All-Southeastern Conference (SEC) selection, an Associated Press honorable mention All-American.

Professional career 

He finished his professional career with the Orlando Renegades of the United States Football League (USFL) during the league's final spring season in 1985.

In his five-season NFL career, Hutchinson appeared in sixty-nine games, started eight of them, and recovered three fumbles.

See also 

 Florida Gators football, 1970–79
 List of Buffalo Bills players
 List of Florida Gators in the NFL Draft

References

Bibliography 

 Carlson, Norm, University of Florida Football Vault: The History of the Florida Gators, Whitman Publishing, LLC, Atlanta, Georgia (2007).  .
 Golenbock, Peter, Go Gators!  An Oral History of Florida's Pursuit of Gridiron Glory, Legends Publishing, LLC, St. Petersburg, Florida (2002).  .
 Hairston, Jack, Tales from the Gator Swamp: A Collection of the Greatest Gator Stories Ever Told, Sports Publishing, LLC, Champaign, Illinois (2002).  .
 McCarthy, Kevin M.,  Fightin' Gators: A History of University of Florida Football, Arcadia Publishing, Mount Pleasant, South Carolina (2000).  .
 Nash, Noel, ed., The Gainesville Sun Presents The Greatest Moments in Florida Gators Football, Sports Publishing, Inc., Champaign, Illinois (1998).  .

1956 births
Living people
American football defensive ends
Buffalo Bills players
Florida Gators football players
Players of American football from Florida
Sportspeople from Winter Park, Florida
Tampa Bay Buccaneers players